Victor Bereciartua (born 26 November, 1948), better known by his stage name Vitico, is an Argentine musician. He is best known for being the lead singer of Viticus, an Argentinian rock band that was created in 2002 in Tigre.

Career
Vitico played the bass guitar in various bands (Los Mods, Alta Tensión, La Joven Guardia) until joined "Billy Bond y su Pesada del Rock and Roll". The 1970s were spent in England, where he played briefly in Bad Company.

Upon his return, in 1980, summoned him to integrate Riff, the continuation of Pappo's Blues. Recorded four albums until 1984. That same year he began his solo career, which was recorded Ha llegado la hora. At the same time, were made his solo shows, was recalled by Pappo Riff for returning.

In late 2002 formed Viticus, his new band and also play of several concerts tribute to Riff.

Discography

With Riff 
 1981: Ruedas de Metal
 1981: Macadam 3...2...1...0...
 1982: Contenidos
 1983: En Acción
 1985: Riff VII
 1987: Riff 'N Roll
 1992: Zona de Nadie
 1995: Paladium '86
 1996: En Vivo en Obras 17/12/85
 1996: Riff en Vivo
 1997: Que Sea Rock

Solo 
 1985: Ha llegado la hora
 1987: Nacido para ser así
 1994: No se si voy a volver

With Vitiken 
 1988: Entertainment

With Tarzen 
 1989: Es una selva ahí fuera

With Viticus 
 2003: Viticus
 2006: Super
 2008: Viticus III
 2011: Rock Local

References

1948 births
People from Buenos Aires
Argentine bass guitarists
Living people
Argentine musicians
Argentine people of Basque descent